Jin Island or Tiu Chung Chau is an island in the Port Shelter, the New Territories, Hong Kong. Administratively it is part of the Sai Kung District.

Geography
Jin Island is located south of the larger island of Kau Sai Chau, from which it is separated by a narrow channel. The island has a maximum elevation of 216 m and an area of 1.8 km2. The smaller Bay Islet (See Chau) is located off its eastern coast, from which it is separated by the channel See Chau Mun.

Because of exposure to the easterly winds and sea waves, landforms such as sea caves, stacks, arches and inlets add to the natural landscape of Jin Island.

The best-known sea cave in Jin Island is Kam Chung Ngam, commonly known as Goldfish Wagging Tail. Tourists can get a perfect shot of the fish shape from the top of the hill.

Conservation
The Ung Kong Group Special Area covers 176.8 hectares and was designated in 2011. It consists of Basalt Island, Bluff Island, Wang Chau, their surrounding islets, and Kam Chung Ngam in the southern part of Jin Island. The geology of the area is characterised by volcanic rocks of the Cretaceous periods.

References

Uninhabited islands of Hong Kong
Sai Kung District
Islands of Hong Kong